Ultra China is a two-day electronic music festival that is a part of Ultra Music Festival's worldwide expansion, which has now spread to twenty-three countries. The inaugural edition of Ultra China will be taking place in Shanghai, China on 9–10 September 2017.

2017 

The inaugural edition of Ultra China took place at the Shanghai Expo Park and featured three stages-the Ultra Main Stage, Resistance, and the Ultra Park Stage.  The lineup included the likes of Armin van Buuren, Sam Feldt, Slushii, Axwell & Ingrosso, Martin Garrix, Porter Robinson, Getter, Nicky Romero, DJ Snake, The Chainsmokers, Unjin, Zedd, Sasha & John Digweed, Technasia, Dubfire, Carl Cox, and many more.  Ultra China's first edition drew an attendance of over 40,000 people.

See also 
 List of electronic dance music festivals
 Ultra Music Festival
 Russell Faibisch
 Ultra Brasil
 Ultra Chile
 Ultra Japan
 Ultra Korea
 Ultra Singapore
 Ultra South Africa
 Ultra Europe
 Ultra Bali
 Road to Ultra

References

External links 
 Ultra Worldwide
 Ultra Buenos Aires

Music festivals in China
Ultra Music